Tadocizumab is a humanized monoclonal antibody that acts on the cardiovascular system. It binds to integrin αIIbβ3, a fibrinogen and fibronectin receptor found on platelets.
 The drug is designed for the treatment of patients undergoing percutaneous coronary interventions. It was developed by Yamanōchi Pharma America, Inc.

References 

Monoclonal antibodies